Robert James-Collier (born 23 September 1976) (known professionally as Rob James-Collier) is a British actor. He is known for his roles as Thomas Barrow in Downton Abbey and as Liam Connor in Coronation Street.

Early life 
James-Collier was born in Salford, Greater Manchester, as Robert James Collier, but hyphenated his middle name and surname to form a new surname in order to comply with the rules of Equity and avoid confusion with another actor whose name was Robert Collier. He was educated at St Patrick's Roman Catholic High School in Eccles, Greater Manchester.

He studied business at the University of Huddersfield for his bachelor’s degree, and later obtained a master's degree in marketing at the University of Manchester Institute of Science and Technology.

Career

Acting 
Having no experience as an actor, James-Collier auditioned for the series Down to Earth. Stars Ricky Tomlinson and Denise Welch were convinced by his talent, and he got the part of the womanising pub landlord. In 2006, he appeared in New Street Law and played a small part as 'Stud' in Shameless series 3, episode 5 under the name of Rob Collier.

In 2006, he joined Coronation Street as Liam Connor, joint owner of the Underworld factory. He left the show in October 2008. In an interview in early-2008, he announced he would leave the soap but planned to return. However, in June 2008, it was reported that the character of Liam was set to be 'brutally' killed off as part of a murder-mystery plotline where three well-known residents fell under suspicion for the crime. 

After leaving Coronation Street, he won a leading role as first footman (and later under-butler) Thomas Barrow in the historical drama series Downton Abbey (2010–2015), subsequently appearing in the franchise's two feature films, Downton Abbey (2019) and Downton Abbey: A New Era (2022). He also appeared in the West End stage version of Calendar Girls.

He played Kevin O'Dowd in ITV's 2016 crime drama, The Level. In 2017, he starred in British horror film, The Ritual; The Guardian described his performance as "a fierce screen presence." He had a principal role in the "Cold River" episode of Vera, aired in 2018. 

In 2019, it was announced that he was cast in the third series of Channel 4 school-drama Ackley Bridge as Martin Evershed.

Modelling 
James-Collier modelled for Argos, where he appeared in the Autumn/Winter 2007 and Spring/Summer 2008 catalogues.

He won the Sexiest Male award at the 2007 and 2008 British Soap Awards in addition to "Best Exit" at the 2009 British Soap Awards. He won Sexiest Male and Best Newcomer at the 2007 Inside Soap Awards.

Filmography

References

External links

1976 births
21st-century English male actors
Alumni of the University of Salford
Alumni of the University of Manchester Institute of Science and Technology
English male models
English male soap opera actors
English male stage actors
Living people
Actors from Stockport
Alumni of the University of Huddersfield
Male actors from Salford